The 2010 Trophée des champions was the 15th edition of the French super cup. The match was contested by the winners of Ligue 1 the previous season, Marseille, and the winners of the Coupe de France the previous season, Paris Saint-Germain. The match was played, for the second consecutive season, on international soil at the Stade Olympique de Radès in Rades, Tunis, Tunisia. Like last year, the idea was to promote French football abroad, but this time more specifically in Africa and the Arab world. The match was televised live on M6 and throughout 53 countries in the world.

The match marked the 74th time Classique rivals Marseille and Paris Saint-Germain played against each other and was the second match, the first being the 2006 French Cup final, in the rivalry's history to not be contested at neither the Stade Vélodrome or the Parc des Princes. On 22 July 2010, the Ligue de Football Professionnel and the Tunisian Football Federation confirmed that international referee Aouaz Trabelsi will officiate the match. Trabelsi was assisted by Béchir Hassani and Yamen Malloulchi and the fourth official was Herzi Riadh.

The supercup was won by Marseille with the club defeating PSG 5–4 on penalties after the match finished 0–0 in regular time. The victory gives Marseille their first Trophée des champions title.
The 2010 edition hosted a record attendance of 57,000 people.

Preview
Defending Ligue 1 champions Marseille arrived in Tunisia with only one new recruit as of 28 July 2010: Spanish defender César Azpilicueta. Azpilicueta joined the club on 21 June after Marseille reached an agreement with his former club Osasuna on a deal valued at €7 million. Aside from Azpilicueta, Ghanaian and Malian internationals André Ayew and Mamadou Samassa returned to the team after loan stints at Arles-Avignon and Valenciennes, respectively. Other loanee returns included Jean-Philippe Sabo and Leyti N'Diaye who both return to the club after a season's stint at Ajaccio.

The Coupe de France champions Paris Saint-Germain arrived in Tunis with two new arrivals to the club: midfielders Mathieu Bodmer and Nenê. Bodmer joined the club on 30 June after a three-year stint at Lyon, while Nenê arrived at the club a week later after a successful individual 2009–10 season with Monaco. Also returning to the team will be former French international Claude Makélélé. Makélélé had previously stated that the 2009–10 season would be his final season as a professional football player, but in June 2010, retracted the statement and signed a new one-year deal with the club. Loris Arnaud returned to the team on 30 June following a six-month loan stint at Clermont. Midfielder Jérôme Rothen also returned to the team on the same date after spending the 2009–10 season on loan at Scottish club Rangers and Turkish club Ankaragücü.

Match details

See also
 2009–10 Ligue 1
 2009–10 Coupe de France

References

External links
 Official site 

Trophee
Trophée des Champions
Trophee Des Champions
Trophee Des Champions 2010
Trophee Des Champions 2010
Sports competitions in Radès
21st century in Radès
Trophee des Champions 2010
July 2010 sports events in Africa
International club association football competitions hosted by Tunisia